Chandravancha is a village located under Tandur Mandal, Vikarabad district, Telangana State, India.

References

Villages in Ranga Reddy district